Lanfranco may refer to:
 Lanfranco, master-builder of the Modena Cathedral
 Guido Lanfranc of Milan (c. 1250–1306), professor of Surgery
 Giovanni Lanfranco (1582–1647), Italian painter
 Guido Lanfranco (born 1930), Maltese writer on natural history and folklore
 Giovanni Lanfranco (volleyball) (born 1956), Italian volleyball player
 Frankie Dettori, flat racing jockey
 Lanfranco (horse), British-trained thoroughbred racehorse

See also:
Lanfranc